List of A-20 Havoc operators identifies the country, military service, and unit that has been supplied or purchased A-20s.

Operators

Australia
Royal Australian Air Force operated 69 Aircraft, 22 DB-7B, 9 A-20C, 9 A-20A and 29 A-20G
No. 22 Squadron RAAF

Brazil
Brazilian Air Force operated 30 A-20K and 1 A-20C
1st Bomb Group Light
2nd Bomb Group Light

Canada
Royal Canadian Air Force
No. 418 Squadron RCAF

France
French Air Force
No. 342 Sqn RAF (Free French)Boston III/IV

Japan
Japanese forces captured some Dutch DB-7B's in Java.
Imperial Japanese Army Air Force
Imperial Japanese Navy Air Service

Netherlands
Royal Netherlands East Indies Army Air Force received only some of the DB-7Bs shipped in lieu of DC-7Cs actually ordered.

Poland
Polish Air Force in Exile in Great Britain
No. 307 Polish Night Fighter Squadron

South Africa
South African Air Force

USSR
Received 2,908 Douglas Havocs, or over one third of total production.
Soviet Air Force
Soviet Naval Air Service
The Soviet Naval Air Service's primary anti-shipping aircraft were Havoc A-20Gs armed with torpedoes and mines.

United Kingdom
Royal Air Force
No. 13 Squadron RAF
No. 14 Squadron RAF
No. 18 Squadron RAF
No. 23 Squadron RAF
No. 55 Squadron RAF
No. 85 Squadron RAF
No. 88 Squadron RAF
No. 93 Squadron RAF
No. 107 Squadron RAF
No. 114 Squadron RAF
No. 226 Squadron RAF
No. 530 Squadron RAF
No. 531 Squadron RAF
No. 532 Squadron RAF
No. 533 Squadron RAF
No. 534 Squadron RAF
No. 535 Squadron RAF
No. 536 Squadron RAF
No. 537 Squadron RAF
No. 538 Squadron RAF (formerly No. 1459 Flight RAF) - Turbinlite
No. 539 Squadron RAF
No. 605 Squadron RAF

United States
United States Army Air Corps
United States Army Air Forces
United States Marine Corps
United States Navy

See also

Douglas A-20 Survivors

Notes

Lists of military units and formations by aircraft
A-20 Havoc